Saraevo is a village in Northwestern Bulgaria, part of Miziya Municipality, Vratsa Province. It is located on Skat River, which discharges into Ogosta nearby, which in its turn discharges into the Danube not far away.

Villages in Vratsa Province